Abbeville High School  may refer to:

Abbeville High School (Alabama), Abbeville, Alabama, United States
Abbeville High School (Louisiana), see Vermilion Parish School Board
Abbeville High School (South Carolina), Abbeville, South Carolina, United States